The Siemens-Schuckert R.VIII was a bomber aircraft designed and built in Germany from 1916.

Design and development
Having built the Steffen R series, Siemens-Schuckert planned to produce a six-engined Riesenflugzeug (giant aeroplane) for the Fliegertruppen des deutschen Kaiserreiches (Imperial German Flying Corps). In common with many of the other contemporary R projects, the R.VIII had all six engines inside the fuselage, where they were tended by mechanics, driving two tractor and two pusher propellers mounted between the mainplanes, via leather cone clutches combining gearboxes, shafts and bevel gearboxes. Two aircraft were built but only the first, R23/16, was completed. 

Ground trials began in 1919, after the armistice but were interrupted by a gearbox failure which resulted in a propeller breaking up and causing extensive damage. The second airframe, R24/16, was never completed and the first was not repaired after the ground running accident due to the restrictions of the Treaty of Versailles. At the time of its completion the Siemens-Schuckert R.VIII was the largest aeroplane in the world; (the Mannesman-Poll triplane was to have been much larger but was not completed before the Versailles Treaty came into force).

Specifications (Siemens-Schuckert R.VIII)

See also

References

 Haddow, G. W. & Grosz, Peter M. The German Giants, The Story of the R-planes 1914–1919. London. Putnam. 1963.
 Gray, Peter & Thetford, Owen. German Aircraft of the First World War. London, Putnam. 
 Sollinger, Guenther, "Villehad Forssman: Constructing German Bombers 1914–1918. Moscow, Rusavia, 2009.

1910s German bomber aircraft
R.VIII
Six-engined push-pull aircraft
Biplanes